The Rt Hon. William Lowry, PC (NI), KC (19 March 1884 – 14 December 1949), was a Northern Irish barrister, judge, Ulster Unionist Party Member of Parliament, and Attorney General for Northern Ireland

Career
Born in Limavady, he was educated at Foyle College, Derry, and Queen's University Belfast. He was called to the Irish Bar in 1907 and was appointed as King's Counsel in 1926. In 1939, he was elected to the Northern Ireland House of Commons as a Unionist member for Londonderry, City, which he represented until 1947. Conor Cruise O'Brien described him as a "unionist of a rather fiercer description." He served as Parliamentary Secretary to the Ministry of Home Affairs from 1940–1943 and Minister of Home Affairs from 1943–1944.

In February 1944, Lowry commentated while Parliament was in session that a local Orange Order Meeting Hall, which had been used by Catholics of the US Army after he had arranged it, would have to be fumigated. His remarks, recorded in the minutes of the day, attracted immediate criticism from fellow ministers, and Lowry was forced to write an apology to The Most Rev. Dr Neil Farren, Lord Bishop of Derry, two days later, though he was adamant that he had misunderstood the situation. O'Brien, however, maintained that Lowry's comments were meant as an ironic and sarcastic response to anti-Catholic extremists on the benches who had objected to the use of the Orange Hall, and he maintained a respect for Lowry throughout his life.

Lowry later went on to serve as Attorney General for Northern Ireland from 1944–1947. He resigned from the Government and from Parliament upon appointment as a Judge of the High Court of Northern Ireland in 1947, as which he served until retiring shortly before his death. He was appointed to the Privy Council for Northern Ireland in 1943, entitling him to be called "The Right Honourable". His son, Lord Lowry, was a Lord of Appeal in Ordinary.

He was a full first cousin (through his mother who was a member of the Lynd family) of the Presbyterian born, Irish speaking, essayist and journalist Robert Lynd

References

Sources
 Biography: William Lowry

1884 births
1949 deaths
People from Limavady
Alumni of Queen's University Belfast
Irish barristers
Ulster Unionist Party members of the House of Commons of Northern Ireland
Members of the House of Commons of Northern Ireland 1938–1945
Members of the House of Commons of Northern Ireland 1945–1949
Members of the Privy Council of Northern Ireland
Northern Ireland Cabinet ministers (Parliament of Northern Ireland)
Attorneys General for Northern Ireland
Northern Ireland junior government ministers (Parliament of Northern Ireland)
High Court judges of Northern Ireland
People educated at Foyle College
Members of the House of Commons of Northern Ireland for County Londonderry constituencies